Beatrice Behan (née ffrench Salkeld; 31 December 1925 – 9 March 1993) was an Irish artist, author, and wife of Brendan Behan.

Early life and education
Beatrice Behan was born Beatrice ffrench Salkeld (also reported as Ffrench Salkeld) on 31 December 1925 on Mount St, Dublin. She was the eldest daughter of artist Cecil Ffrench Salkeld and a domestic economy instructor from Berlin, Irma Salkeld (née Taesler). The poet Blanaid Salkeld was her paternal grandmother. Behan grew up on Morehampton Road, Dublin, spending time in Glencree, County Wicklow. She attended Loreto Convent, St Stephen's Green, going on to study art at the National College of Art and Design (NCAD). She first attended NCAD as a day student, then moving to study in the evening while working as a temporary clerk.

Career
After graduating from NCAD, she took up as a position as a botanical assistant in the Natural History Museum, where she worked from 1949 to 1955. During this time she undertook further art study in Milan, Siena, and Florence. From 1948 to 1950, Behan exhibited with the Royal Hibernian Academy. Her work was exhibited at the Oireachtas Exhibition in 1957 and 1958, the Irish Living Art Exhibition in 1959, in New York in 1969 and 1970 and at the Irish pavilion at the World Fair in 1972. She assisted her father with murals in Davy Byrne's pub, Dublin, which she maintained afterwards.

Married life

Through her family, she was introduced to Brendan Behan while she was still in school. They met again years later, and after a brief relationship, the couple married in February 1955. The couple's only daughter, Blanaid, was born shortly before his death in 1963. Later on, Behan had a son, Paudge Behan, with Cathal Goulding.

When the couple were first married, she supplemented the family's income by working as a horticultural illustrator with The Irish Times. The couple were based in Dublin, but they spent periods of time in Paris, New York and London. Behan was tolerant of her husband's heavy drinking and behaviour, describing him as a "great, loveable genius." She illustrated her husband's Hold your hour and have another (1963). After her husband's death she worked with Alan Simpson on the unfinished play Richard's cork leg.

Later life
In 1973, Behan published her memoir My life with Brendan. After her husband's death, Behan settled all of his many debts. Behan was found dead at her home on Anglesea Rd, Ballsbridge on 9 March 1993.

References

Irish artists
1925 births
1993 deaths
People educated at Loreto College, St Stephen's Green